Periya Negamam (also known as Negamam) is a panchayat town in Coimbatore district in the southern Indian State of Tamil Nadu. It comes under Pollachi Taluk and pollachi Assembly constituency. Negamam used to be a popular small town serving the commercial and transport needs of many small villages around it until 1980s. With the arrival of frequent city buses to Pollachi and Udumalpet as transportation mode, growth of Negamam remained stunted. Weekly market on Tuesday used to be a big crowd puller.

Demographics
 India census, Periya Negamam had a population of 7680. Males constitute 51% of the population and females 49%. Periya Negamam has an average literacy rate of 67%, higher than the national average of 59.5%: male literacy is 75%, and female literacy is 58%. In Periya Negamam, 10% of the population is under 6 years of age.

Geography
It consists of several villages. Amongst the popular villages is Senguttaipalayam, the birthplace of Bharat Ratna Chidambaram Subramaniam, Senior Congressional leader, Father of the Green Revolution in India, former Minister of Finance and Education in the Government of Tamil Nadu and former Union Minister for Food, Agriculture and Finance in the Government of India.

Another politician from Negamam is K V Kandasamy Gounder. He was returned to the Assembly from this constituency thrice on an AIADMK ticket. He was widely considered to be the right-hand man of M. G. Ramachandran. In the 1977 election he defeated the then DMK cabinet minister M. Kannappan.

Other villages include Avalappampatti, Konde Goundan Palayam, Chinna Negamam and Kakkadavu (hub of the coir industries).

Educational institutions

Schools
 Government Higher Secondary School, Periya Negamam (including an NSS unit).
 Government Girl's High School, Periya Negamam
 Government Elementary School, Periya Negamam
 Sri Vigneshwara Vidhyala School, Periya Negamam
 Vivekananda Nursery & Primary school, Periya Negamam
 Pollachi institute of technology at Avalappam Patti

Infrastructure

Transportation
Periya Negamam has a central bus stand which is used by TNSTC and the private operators. This is situated in the heart of the town. The town is well connected with Pollachi (10 km), Coimbatore (30 km), Tiruppur (30 km), Dharapuram and Udumalpet by well laid roads. Government and private buses connect these towns. Nearest railway station is Pollachi (10 km) and major railway station is Coimbatore (30 km). Coimbatore also has an international airport.

Telecommunications
Periya Negamam is well connected with all GSM & CDMA mobile phone operators. The major players Jio, Airtel, BSNL, Tata Docomo, Reliance, Idea and Vodafone in GSM, and Tata Indicom in the CDMA segment all cover Periya Negamam.

Agriculture
Coconut farms are the main agricultural activity. Vast areas of this region are covered with coconut farms. small agrifarmers are available they are cultivate tomato, onion, chilli, coriander leaf,.

Employment
Most of the people's jobs are operating handlooms, making Negaman Sarees (Cotton Sarees or Saris) in vibrant colours on handlooms. These handloom sarees are popular throughout Tamil Nadu. Around 100,000 handloom sarees are made per month in the region.

References

Cities and towns in Coimbatore district